St. Paul's International College (formerly known as Aurora College) is an independent Roman Catholic secondary day and boarding school, in the Southern Highlands town of , New South Wales, Australia.

St. Paul's International College caters to Australian and overseas students from Year 7 to Year 12 and University Foundation Studies, with the majority of students coming from Asian countries.

History 
Built in 1878, Elm Court House was purchased in 1891 by the Dominican Nuns of West Maitland, who opened an all girls school on 2 February 1891 known as Mount St. Mary's Convent School. Later becoming known as the Dominican Convent school. On 22 October 1984 it was purchased by the Sisters of St Paul de Chartres opening in 1986 as Aurora College. In 1997 Sister Angelina Fong arrived as School Director and changed its name from Aurora College to St Paul's International College.

St Paul's was initially a senior secondary school catering for years 11 and 12 (ages 17 and 18). In 2009 enrolment was open for years 9 and 10 (aged 15 and 16), and in 2012 for years 7 and 8 (ages 13 and 14).

In January 2020, about 35 international students who have returned to school after visiting China are in lockdown. The move was made following growing concerns about the potentially lethal Coronavirus.

Campus 

Subjects 
The college has a range of subjects :

Religion
English
Mathematics
Science
History
Language (Chinese)
Geography
Commerce
Technology and Applied Studies
Creative Arts (Visual Arts & Music)
Personal Development, Health & Physical Education
Economics
Business Studies
Legal Studies
Information Technology
Physics
Chemistry
Biology
Visual Arts
Chinese for Background Speakers
Chinese for Beginners

See also 

 List of Catholic schools in New South Wales
 List of boarding schools in Australia
 Catholic education in Australia

References

External links 

Catholic boarding schools in Australia
Boarding schools in New South Wales
Catholic secondary schools in New South Wales
Moss Vale, New South Wales
Educational institutions established in 1986
1986 establishments in Australia